The Moltke II cabinet was the government of Denmark from 16 November 1848 to 13 July 1851. It was also referred to as the November Cabinet.

It was replaced by the Moltke III cabinet on 13 July 1851.

List of ministers and portfolios
Some of the terms in the table end after 15 November 1848 because the minister was in the Cabinet of Moltke II as well.

References

1848 establishments in Denmark
1851 disestablishments
Moltke 2